Rong Kwang is a district (amphoe) in the northeastern part of Phrae province, northern Thailand.

Geography
Neighboring districts are (from the southwest clockwise): Mueang Phrae, Nong Muang Khai, and Song of Phrae Province; Wiang Sa, Na Noi, and Na Muen of Nan province.

History
The minor district (king amphoe) Rong Kwang was upgraded to a full district in 1909.

Administration
The district is divided into 11 sub-districts (tambons), which are further subdivided into 93 villages (mubans). The township (thesaban tambon) Rong Kwang covers parts of tambon Rong Kwang and parts of tambons Rong Khem and Thung Si. There are a further nine tambon administrative organizations (TAO).

Missing numbers are tambons which now form Nong Muang Khai District.

References

External links
amphoe.com (Thai)

Rong Kwang